Miki Yokobori Shimada (born 13 May 1975) is a Japanese former professional tennis player. She is married to Thomas Shimada, who played Davis Cup tennis for Japan. 

Yokobori competed on the professional tour in the early 1990s and reached a best singles ranking of 246 in the world. She made her WTA Tour main draw debut at the 1992 Pan Pacific Open in Tokyo and appeared in her only other singles main draw in 1994, when she qualified for the China Open. During her career she featured in the qualifying draws for both the Australian Open and US Open.

ITF finals

Singles: 2 (2–0)

Doubles: 2 (2–0)

References

External links
 
 

1975 births
Living people
Japanese female tennis players
20th-century Japanese women
21st-century Japanese women